Nibbāna: The Mind Stilled (Sinhalese: නිවනේ නිවීම, Nivanē nivīma) is the translation of a series of 33 sermons delivered in Sinhala by Venerable Bhikkhu Katukurunde Ñāṇananda during the late 1980s & early 1990s. The main focus of the sermons was on the psychological import of the term nibbāna and the deeper philosophical implications underlying this much-vexed term. The first volume of the 7-volume series was published in 2003.

History 
It was inspired by an invitation that came from his revered teacher, the late venerable Matara Sri Ñāṇārāma Mahathera, the chief incumbent of the Nissarana Vanaya Hermitage in Meetirigala and an illustrious exponent of Insight Meditation in Sri Lanka. The sermons were delivered once every fortnight before the group of resident monks from August 1988 to January 1991. Thirty three sermons have been published in seven volumes.

Venerable Ñāṇananda had already written four books during the early phase of his monk’s life at Island Hermitage, Dodanduwa. They were Concept and Reality in Early Buddhist Thought, Samyutta Nikaya – An Anthology(Part 2), Ideal Solitude and The Magic of the Mind.
He came under the tutelage of the late venerable Matara Sri Ñāṇārama Mahathera, when he shifted to Nissarana Vanaya Hermitage in 1972. The meeting of these two eminent disciples of the Buddha in a teacher-pupil relationship for nearly two decades, led to an outstanding seminal contribution to the understanding of Dhamma in its correct perspective.

What’s inside? 
Nibbāna - the Bliss Supreme(Dhammapada 203) is the goal of the spiritual endeavour in Buddhism. It has been variously understood and interpreted by scholars both ancient and modern. Bhikkhu Ñāṇananda has followed a line of interpretation which highlights the psychological import of the term nibbāna drawing out at the same time the deeper philosophical implications underlying this much-vexed term. The original meaning and significance of the term nibbāna has been examined in the light of the evidence from the discourses of the Pali canon. The thoroughgoing analysis has entailed a reappraisal of some of the most controversial discourses on nibbāna.

In his analysis he has ventured to re-interpret the discourses dealing with the law of Dependent arising (paṭiccasmuppāda) and the Middle Path. He has taken the opportunity to expatiate on the topics he has dealt in brief in his 'Concept and Reality' and 'Magic of the Mind'. His novel interpretation of the Law of Dependent arising in terms of a Vortex finds fuller expression here.  So also the via media he has suggested in pointing to the ‘Relative validity and Pragmatic value of concepts’.

This middle path approach reasserts the ethical foundation of Early Buddhism and reaffirms the prospect of inward peace ‘here-and-now’. The penetrative analysis of the role of language and logic has in it much that is revealing and refreshing to the semantic philosopher.

The sermons are currently being studied in the context of early Buddhist thought in a free-of-charge three-year e-learning program (2017-2018) offered by Bhikkhu Anālayo of the Numata Center for Buddhist Studies at the University of Hamburg in cooperation with the Barre Center for Buddhist Studies (Mass.).

Topics covered

Free Distribution of Dhamma 
The venerable author of this series has also effected a significant change in the methods adopted to reach the seekers of Dhamma. Drawing inspiration from the dictum "The Gift of Dhamma excels all other gifts"(Dhammapada 354) he has specified that all publications should be distributed free as ‘gifts of Dhamma’. The Free Distribution of Dhamma (dhammadāna-ideal)  has been upheld by the Buddha in the following exhortation to the monks:

{| style="border:darkgray solid 2px;background-color:#E5E5E5;padding: 0px 2px 2px 2px;"
|“Monks, there are these two kinds of gifts: the gift of material things and the gift of Dhamma. Of these two gifts, monks, this is supreme (namely): the gift of Dhamma.”

“Monks, there are these two kinds of distribution: the distribution of material things and the distribution of Dhamma. Of these two kinds of distribution, monks, this is supreme (namely): the distribution of Dhamma.”

      (Itivuttaka 3.5.9)
|}

A group of lay enthusiasts initiated a Dhamma Publications Trust (Sinhala: Dharma Grantha Mudrana Bhaaraya - D.G.M.B.) to bring out the sermons in book form providing an opportunity to the Buddhist public to contribute towards the publication. A few years later an affiliated Trust (Sinhala: Dharma Shravana Maadhya Bhaaraya - D.S.M.B.) was set up to make the sermons available in audio form-again as a free gift to the Buddhist public.

This benevolent movement has a spiritual dimension in reaffirming the age-old Buddhist values attached to dhammadāna, fast eroding before the hungry waves of commercialization. It has proved its worth by creating a healthy cultural atmosphere in which the readers and listeners shared the 'Dhamma-gift' with others, thus moulding the links of salutary friendship (kalyāna-mittatā) indispensable for the continuity of Buddhism.

As the Venerable author emphasizes, Dhamma deserves no ‘price-tag’ precisely because it is ‘price-less’.  Is everything that comes free to us, necessarily worthless? What about the air and the sunshine?

Many a parched traveller on the desert path has had a refreshing drink of the nectar of Dhamma free of charge ever since. Many an enthusiastic benevolent heart seized the opportunity to participate in a genuine act of dhammadāna.

It is in point of merit that the "gift of Dhamma excels all other gifts". Dhamma is the nectar that quenches the insatiate samsaric (pali:saṃsāra: Cycle of rebirth) thirst of beings. The gift of Dhamma is therefore of far greater merit than an ordinary gift of food or drink.(AN 9,5)
For those who are magnanimous- Dhammadāna is forever an unfailing source of altruistic joy.

English translation

See also 
 Conceptual proliferation

References

External links 
 Dhamma Sermons and Books by Venerable Bhikkhu Katukurunde Nananada
 Entry in National Library of Sri Lanka site
 Entry in the British Library
 Books and talks by Ven. Nanananda Thera
 Interviews with Ven. Nanananda Thera

Buddhist philosophy
Buddhist meditation
Buddhist sermons